This is a list of sprint canoeists by country.

Australia
 Nathan Baggaley

Belarus
Leonid Geishtor

Canada
 Frank Amyot
 Mylanie Barre
 Caroline Brunet
 Tamas Buday Jr.
 Attila Buday
 Larry Cain
 Jillian D'Alessio
 Richard Dalton
 David Ford
 Karen Furneaux
 Stephen Giles
 Kamini Jain
 Carrie Lightbound
 Angus Mortimer
 Ian Mortimer
 Michael Scarola
 Serge Corbin
 Adam van Koeverden
 Ken Whiting

Denmark
 Henning Lynge Jakobsen

Hungary
 Balázs Babella
 Dalma Benedek
 Zoltán Benkő
 István Beé
 Kinga Bóta
 Ferenc Csipes
 Kinga Czigány
 Éva Dónusz
László Fábián
Imre Farkas
 László Fidel
 László Foltán, Sr.
 László Foltán, Jr.
Klára Fried-Bánfalvi
 Erika Géczi
 Gergely Gyertyános
 Zsolt Gyulay
 Sándor Hódosi
 Csaba Horváth
 Gábor Horváth
 Csaba Hüttner
 Natasa Janics
 Márton Joób
 Viktor Kadler
 Zoltán Kammerer
 Rita Kőbán
 György Kolonics
 Katalin Kovács
 György Kozmann
 Gábor Kucsera
 Roland Kökény
 Erika Mészáros
 Ferenc Novák
 Tímea Paksy
Anna Pfeffer
 Imre Pulai
 Éva Rakusz
 Pál Sarudi
 Botond Storcz
 István Szabó
 Szilvia Szabó
 Attila Vajda
 István Vaskúti
 Ákos Vereckei
 Erzsébet Viski
 György Zala
 Attila Ábrahám

Israel
Lior Karmi
Michael Kolganov
Rami Zur

Moldova
Naum Prokupets

New Zealand
 Ben Fouhy

Norway
 Nils Olav Fjeldheim
 Andreas Gjersøe
 Knut Holmann
 Eirik Verås Larsen
 Mattis Næss
 Jacob Norenberg

Poland
 Marek Twardowski

Romania
Leon Rotman

Sweden
 Agneta Andersson
 Erik Bladström
 Tage Fahlborg
 Gert Fredriksson
 Susanne Gunnarsson
 John Hron
 Sven Johansson
 Helge Larsson
 Henrik Nilsson
 Markus Oscarsson

United States
Rami Zur

See also
ICF Canoe Sprint World Championships
List of Olympic medalists in canoeing (men)
List of Olympic medalists in canoeing (women)

Canoeists by country